Prime Suspect is an American television program that aired in syndication from 1992 to 1995, and was hosted by Mike Hegedus.

The show, which was loosely based on, but had no connections to America's Most Wanted, profiled cases involving the search for and apprehension of fugitives wanted for serious crimes, including murder, rape, kidnapping, child sexual abuse, white-collar crime, organized crime, robbery, gang, and terrorism.

Cultural References
Prime Suspect was referenced in Season 3, Episode 14 of the podcast Undisclosed: The State vs. Dennis Perry. In the podcast, the legal team investigating a miscarriage of justice of Dennis Perry sought to find an episode of Prime Suspect that pertained to the murder of Harold and Thelma Swain, hoping it would help them uncover the timeline of false information being injected into the investigation. No tape was able to be uncovered and they continue to seek a recording of this Prime Suspect episode.

References

1992 American television series debuts
1995 American television series endings
1990s American reality television series
1990s American television news shows
English-language television shows
First-run syndicated television programs in the United States
Law enforcement in the United States
Television series featuring reenactments